Jamboo is 1980 Indian Tamil-language action adventure film, co-written, directed and produced by M. Karnan from a story by Maa. Ra. The film stars Jaishankar, leading an ensemble cast that includes Major Sundarrajan, S. A. Ashokan, Thengai Srinivasan, M. R. R. Vasu, Manorama and Jayamala. It was released on 15 January 1980.

Plot 

A varied group of travellers on a flight to the United States find themselves stranded on an island. They are rescued by Jamboo, who has lived on the island by himself since childhood. He is capable of surviving the harsh surrounding full of wild animals, raging rivers and other natural dangers. Jamboo takes on the task of keeping the crash survivors alive and eventually lead them off the island. They are forced to stay on the island until the circumstances are right for them to attempt an escape. The film chronicles the many varied dangers they face as they attempt to get home.

Cast 

 Jaishankar as Jamboo
 Major Sundarrajan as Saamy
 S. A. Ashokan as Paranthaman
 Thengai Srinivasan
 M. R. R. Vasu
 Manorama as Anjalai
 Jayamala as Geetha
 Jaya Vani as Radha
 Lalitha as Noori
 Praveena as Tribal princess
 Mallika
 Jothi Kanna
 Kanchana
 Vimala
 Manjula
 Kovai Shantha
 Vennira Aadai Moorthy
 S. V. Ramadas
 Oru Viral Krishna Rao
 Mottai Seetha Raman
 P. L. Selvaraj
 Franco
 Prabhakar
 Master Sivakumar

Soundtrack 
Music was written by Shankar–Ganesh and lyrics were written by Kannadasan.

References

External links 

1980 films
1980s action adventure films
1980s Tamil-language films
Films directed by M. Karnan
Films scored by Shankar–Ganesh
Indian action adventure films